The 2020 Meistriliiga (known as A. Le Coq Premium Liiga for sponsorship reasons) was the 30th season of the Meistriliiga, the top Estonian league for association football clubs. The season began on 6 March 2020, but was suspended after the first round due to the COVID-19 pandemic. The league continued on 19 May 2020. The season concluded on 6 December, with the last match between Flora and FCI Levadia cancelled due to COVID-19 cases in both teams. The defending champions Flora successfully defended their title, winning second title in a row and their 13th in total.

Teams
Ten teams competed in the league, nine sides from the 2019 season and 2019 Esiliiga champions TJK Legion. Legion made their debut in the top tier after consecutive promotions from fourth tier in three seasons. Maardu Linnameeskond were relegated at the end of the 2019 season after finishing in the bottom of the table. Kuressaare retained their Meistriliiga spot after winning a relegation play-off against Esiliiga runners-up Vaprus.

Venues

Personnel and kits

Managerial changes

Format changes
Due to the long pause, the season was shortened. Instead of the regular format of each team playing each of the other teams four times, the league were to be split after the third playthrough into two sections of top 6 and bottom 4, with each team playing each other in that section.

On 7 November, due to the second wave of COVID-19, the season was shortened even more with the league split into three sections after the 27th round – top 4, 5th & 6th, and bottom 4, with each team playing each other in that section.

On 11 December the season's last match between Flora and FCI Levadia was cancelled.

League table

Relegation play-offs
At season's end Kuressaare, the ninth place club, participated in a two-legged play-off with the runners-up (of independent teams) of the 2020 Esiliiga, Maardu Linnameeskond, for the spot in 2021 Meistriliiga.

Kuressaare won 9–5 on aggregate and retained their Meistriliiga spot for the 2021 season.

Fixtures and results
A total of four rounds was played. In the first three rounds teams played each other three times. In the fourth round the league was split into 3 groups – top 4, 5th and 6th, and bottom 4, where they played each team in their group one more time.

Rounds 1–18

Rounds 19–27

Top four rounds 28–30

Fifth & sixth round 28

Bottom four rounds 28–30

Season statistics

Top scorers

Hat-tricks

Awards

Monthly awards

Team of the season

Source:

{|style="width:100%;"
|width="50%"|

Player transfers
 Winter 2019–20 – before the season

See also
 2020 in Estonian football

References

External links
Official website

Meistriliiga seasons
1
Estonia
Estonia
Meistriliiga